Sjöman is a Swedish surname literally meaning "seaman". Notable people with the surname include:
Rosalie Sjöman
Tord Sjöman
Vilgot Sjöman

Swedish-language surnames